is a Japanese footballer who playing as a forward and currently play for Okinawa SV.

Career 

Ichiki, in his youth career, played at Shin-Kiryu FC, Sakuragi Junior High School FC, Ota High School FC, and at Tokyo Gakugei University FC. He graduated from university in 2020.

On 26 December 2020, Ichiki was announced as one of the new Thespakusatsu Gunma signings for the 2021 season.

On 28 March 2021, he made his professional club debut, participating in a match against Giravanz Kitakyushu in Matchweek 5, being subbed in the second half. On 31 July of the same year, Ichiki was loaned out to JFL club FC Kariya. He left from the club at the end of the 2021 season, after participating in FC Kariya's loss against Criacao Shinjuku on the Champions League, which led Kariya to be relegated to the Regional Leagues.

On 8 January 2022, Ichiki was loaned again by Gunma, now to KSL team Okinawa SV. He was influential in the 2022 Okinawa SV season, scoring 22 goals in 18 matches in the KSL, and four goals in six matches in the Regional Champions League. In the last match of this competition, Ichiki played his final match of his loan tenure against FC Kariya, his former club. He scored a goal in the 42nd minute, securing a 4–0 win. As a result, he helped to bring his club promotion to the JFL, which will be Okinawa's debut in the league, qualifying for it after finishing as Regional Champions League runners-up, behind champions Briobecca Urayasu. On 21 December of the same year, Ichiki was permanently transferred from Thespakusatsu Gunma to Okinawa SV for the upcoming 2023 season.

Career statistics

Club 

.

Notes

Honours 
Okinawa SV
Kyushu Soccer League Champions: 2022
Individual
Kyushu Soccer League Top-scorer: 2022

References

External links 
Profile on Thespakusatsu Gunma 
 Profile on Okinawa SV 

 

1998 births
Living people
People from Kiryū, Gunma
Sportspeople from Gunma Prefecture
Tokyo Gakugei University alumni
Japanese footballers
Association football forwards
J2 League players
Japan Football League players
Thespakusatsu Gunma players
FC Kariya players
Okinawa SV players